Where's My Wandering Boy Tonight? is a 1922 American comedy drama silent black-and-white film directed by James P. Hogan and Millard Webb, written by Gerald C. Duffy and produced by B.F. Zeidman.

Cast 
 Cullen Landis as Garry Beecher
 Carl Stockdale as Silas Rudge
 Virginia True Boardman as Martha Beecher
 Patsy Ruth Miller as Lorna Owens
 Kathleen Key as Veronica Tyler
 Ben Deeley as Stewart Kilmer
 Clarence Badger Jr. as R. Sylvester Jones

References

External links 

 

1922 comedy-drama films
American silent feature films
American black-and-white films
Films directed by James Patrick Hogan
Films directed by Millard Webb
Films produced by B. F. Zeidman
Films with screenplays by Gerald Duffy
1922 films
1920s American films
Silent American comedy-drama films